Roger Baker may refer to:
Roger Baker (handballer) (born 1946), American former handball player
Roger W. Baker, Assistant Secretary for Information and Technology for the Department of Veterans Affairs
Roger Baker (MP) (fl. 1406), English politician